Marie-Luise Schramm (born 2 May 1984) is a German actress who specializes in dubbing.

She is the only daughter of actor Bernd Schramm and has three older brothers. She planned on becoming a football player, but knee problems forced her to give this up. To this day, she is an enthusiastic supporter of Hertha BSC Berlin.

Filmography

Television animation 
 Angela Anaconda (Angela Anaconda (Sue Rose))
 Avatar: The Last Airbender (Toph (Jessie Flower))
 Bubble Guppies (Nonny)
 Digimon Adventure (Kari Kamiya (Kae Araki))
 Dr. Slump (second series) (Arale Norimaki (Taeko Kawata))
 Growing Up Creepie (Carla (Stephanie Anne Mills))
 Texhnolyze (Ran (Shizuka Itō))
 W.I.T.C.H. (Taranee Cook (Kali Troy))
 Kitty Is Not a Cat ((Kitty))

Live action 
 Alice in Wonderland (Alice Kingsleigh)
 Alice Through the Looking Glass (Alice Kingsleigh)
24 (Linda (Agnes Bruckner))
Alias (Kelly McNeil (Agnes Bruckner))
Desperate Housewives (Sarah (Mae Whitman))
Grey's Anatomy (Heather Douglas (Mae Whitman))
Mrs. Doubtfire (Natalie Hillard (Mara Wilson))
Thief (Tammi Deveraux (Mae Whitman))
Thomas and the Magic Railroad (Lily (Mara Wilson))

External links 
Official site

German Dubbing Card Index

1984 births
Living people
Actresses from Berlin
German voice actresses